Thomas Spencer may refer to:

Thomas Spencer (minister) (1791–1811), English congregationalist
Thomas Spencer (priest), English Anglican priest 
Thomas Spencer (mathematical physicist) (born 1946), American mathematical physicist
Thomas Edward Spencer (1845–1911), Australian writer
Thomas Spencer (businessman) (1852–1905), cashier, co-founder of Marks & Spencer
Thomas Spencer (settler) (1607–1687), early settler of Hartford, Connecticut
Sir Thomas Spencer, 3rd Baronet (1639–1685), politician
Thomas Spencer (MP for Southwark), MP for Southwark, 1406–1415
Thomas Spencer (cricketer) (1850–1933), English cricketer
Sir Thomas Spencer, 1st Baronet (1586–1622), of the Spencer baronets
Sir Thomas Spencer, 4th Baronet (died 1722) of the Spencer baronets
W. Thomas Spencer (born 1928), American politician
Thomas Alfred Spencer (1860–1937), member of the Queensland Legislative Assembly

See also
Tommy Spencer (born 1945), Scottish footballer
Tom Spencer (disambiguation)